The AGM-78 Standard ARM was an anti-radiation missile developed by General Dynamics, United States.

Overview
Originally developed for the US Navy during the late 1960s, the AGM-78 was created in large part because of the limitations of the AGM-45 Shrike, which suffered from a small warhead, limited range and a poor guidance system. General Dynamics was asked to create an air-launched ARM by modifying the RIM-66 SM-1 surface-to-air missile. This use of an "off the shelf" design greatly reduced development costs, and trials of the new weapon began in 1967 after only a year of development. The first operational missiles were issued in early 1968.

The AGM-78 was nicknamed the "Starm", an abbreviation of Standard ARM. The first version of the missile, the A1 Mod 0, was little more than an air-launched RIM-66 with the Shrike's anti radar seeker head attached to the front. An Aerojet Mark 27 MOD 4 dual-thrust solid-rocket-powered the missile, which was fitted with a blast-fragmentation warhead. Although more capable, the AGM-78 was much more expensive than the AGM-45 Shrike which continued in service for some time. The new missile was carried by the F-105F/G and the A-6B/E.

Variants

An inert training version of the AGM-78A was built as ATM-78A. Of equal size, mass and shape, the missile lacked a seeker head, warhead, or propulsion systems and was essentially just a dead weight.

An A2 model introduced a bomb damage assessment (BDA) capability and an SDU-6/B phosphorus target marker flare to facilitate targeting of the site for follow up attacks.

In 1969 an improved model called the AGM-78B was produced. This featured a broadband seeker which allowed the missile to be used against a much wider variety of targets without having to select the seeker before the mission. A simple memory circuit was also included, allowing the missile to attack a target once it locked on, even if the radar was shut down. Previous ARMs would veer off course and miss when they lost a target, and as a result flipping the radar on and off had become a standard tactic for missile batteries.

Some early AGM-78A1s were updated with the new memory circuit and seeker. These missiles were designated as the AGM-78A4. The AGM-78B was the most important version of the missile, and was widely used by the Air Force's F-4G Phantom II Wild Weasel aircraft.

A training version of the AGM-78B was created, and was known as the ATM-78B.

In the early 1970s the AGM-78C was produced. A US Air Force project, the C model was primarily intended to be more reliable and cheaper to build. It had a SDU-29/B white phosphorus target marker. Some older missiles were upgraded to the AGM-78C standard. As before, an ATM-78C training missile was produced.

Between 1973 and 1976 the AGM-78D was produced, introducing a new motor. A follow up missile, the AGM-78D2, had an active optical fuze, still greater reliability, and a new  blast-fragmentation warhead. The ATM-78D training missile followed.

The RGM-66D shipborne anti-radiation missile used the basic AGM-78 airframe along with features of the RIM-66 and AIM-97 Seekbat air-to-air missile.

Including all versions, over 3,000 AGM-78 missiles were built. Production stopped in the late 1970s, but the missile continued in service for almost a decade before the last examples were replaced by the AGM-88 HARM in the late 1980s.

Operators

External links

 USAF Museum AGM-78 factsheet
 Designation-systems.net

AGM-078
AGM-078
Surface-to-surface missiles of the United States
Anti-radiation missiles of the Cold War
Military equipment introduced in the 1960s